Cozmești is a commune in Vaslui County, Western Moldavia, Romania. It is composed of four villages: Bălești, Cozmești, Fâstâci and Hordilești. These were part of Delești Commune until 2004, when they were split off.

See also
Fâstâci Monastery

References

Communes in Vaslui County
Localities in Western Moldavia